Jean Duverger (born 5 April 1973 in Cosamaloapan, Veracruz) is a Mexican actor and entertainer.

Life and career
He is of French-Haitian ancestry. From 1981 to 1983, he studied at the Centro de Educacion Artística. Between 1988 and 1991, he was a backup dancer for the singer Yuri. Duverger was a member of Timbiriche from 1992-1993. He appeared in various telenovelas of Televisa from 1989 to 1999. In 2000 he began working for TV Azteca. He currently works for Fox Sports in Mexico and is the host of the television show "Fox Para Todos" (Fox for Everyone).

In June 2015, Duverger revealed that he was contacted by various "agencies" that offered monetary compensation for favorable tweets of the Green Party, which he refused. This revelation came after speculation that unusually supportive tweets by celebrities and sports figures in the days prior to the 2015 elections had been bought by the Partido Verde.

Filmography

Film and television

References

External links
 

1973 births
Living people
Mexican male dancers
Mexican people of French descent
Mexican people of Haitian descent
Singers from Veracruz
Male actors from Veracruz
Mexican male telenovela actors
Mexican male television actors
Timbiriche members
20th-century Mexican dancers
21st-century Mexican dancers
20th-century Mexican male actors
21st-century Mexican male actors